Ali Marchant, born Alastair James Marchant, is a UK Radio DJ on Oxford's FM 107.9 and also DJs at clubs including Risa/Jongleurs in Birmingham.

Biography
Ali Marchant was born and brought up in Thanet, Kent, living in the seaside town of Broadstairs.  He was educated at Chatham House Grammar School in Ramsgate.

He then attended the University of Birmingham, where he gained a bachelor's degree in Geology and Geography, and subsequently took a master's degree in Marketing.

Following his master's degree, Marchant was elected to the position of Vice President (Internal Affairs) for the Guild of Students, responsible for internal discipline and communications. During his vice-presidency there was a controversy surrounding the censure of a student group promoting Palestinian rights at a meeting.

DJ Work
Marchant started DJing while at school, and when at university did club and radio work.  He worked at the Guild of Students DJing nights and made appearances on the student radio station Burn FM. He then worked at many Birmingham clubs as both resident and guest.

In 2008 he entered the Radiostar 2008 competition on Oxford's FM 107.9.  He and four other short-listed candidates co-presented a live breakfast show in July 2008; Marchant was announced the winner, and became host of the station's chart show.

References

British radio DJs
Living people
1980 births